Omlenice is a municipality and village in Český Krumlov District in the South Bohemian Region of the Czech Republic. It has about 600 inhabitants.

Administrative parts
Villages of Blažkov, Omlenička, Stradov and Výnězda are administrative parts of Omlenice.

References

External links

 

Villages in Český Krumlov District